
Year 355 BC was a year of the pre-Julian Roman calendar. At the time, it was known as the Year of the Consulship of Peticus and Poplicola (or, less frequently, year 399 Ab urbe condita). The denomination 355 BC for this year has been used since the early medieval period, when the Anno Domini calendar era became the prevalent method in Europe for naming years.

Events 
 By place 
 Greece 
 King Artaxerxes III of Persia forces Athens to conclude a peace which requires the city to leave Asia Minor and to acknowledge the independence of its rebellious allies.
 King Archidamus III of Sparta supports the Phocians against Thebes in the "Sacred War".
 Chares' war party in Athens is replaced by one under Eubulus which favours peace. Eubulus restores the economic position of Athens without increasing the burden of taxation and improves the Athenian fleet while its docks and fortifications are repaired.

Births 
 Cassander, companion of Alexander the Great, successor king of Macedonia and founder of Antipatrid dynasty (approximate date) (d. c. 297 BC)

Deaths 
 Eudoxus of Cnidus, Greek astronomer and mathematician (b. c. 408 BC)

References